Belkacem Khadir (born June 14, 1981 in Tizi Ouzou) is an Algerian footballer who currently plays for the Slovak 4. liga club FK Junior Kanianka. He previously played for Topvar Topoľčany in the 3. liga.

Career
Khadir began his career in his hometown club of JS Kabylie. After progressing through the junior ranks of the club, he joined JSM Tiaret in the Algerian Second Division. In the summer of 2006, he joined capital side CR Belouizdad in the top flight but left in the winter transfer window to join second division side MC El Eulma. In the summer of 2007 he signed with ASM Oran, scoring 13 goals in the 2007-2008 season.

In the summer of 2008, Khadir signed with Slovakian side MFK Topoľčany. After just a few games with the club Khadir has already been linked with a move to MŠK Žilina.

References

1981 births
Living people
Footballers from Tizi Ouzou
Kabyle people
Algerian footballers
JS Kabylie players
CR Belouizdad players
Expatriate footballers in Slovakia
Algerian expatriate sportspeople in Slovakia
Algerian expatriate footballers
MC El Eulma players
ASM Oran players
Algeria youth international footballers
JSM Tiaret players
MFK Topvar Topoľčany players
3. Liga (Slovakia) players
4. Liga (Slovakia) players
Association football forwards
21st-century Algerian people